The rusty blenny or Black Sea blenny (Parablennius sanguinolentus) is a species of combtooth blenny found in the eastern Atlantic: Loire mouth, France to Morocco including the Mediterranean and Black Sea.  This species reaches a length of  TL.

References

rusty blenny
Fish of the Mediterranean Sea
Fish of the Black Sea
Fish of Europe
Marine fauna of North Africa
rusty blenny